The 2017 Africa U-17 Cup of Nations was an international age-restricted football tournament which was held in Gabon from 14–28 May. The 8 representative teams involved in the tournament were required to register a squad of 21 players, including three goalkeepers. Only players born or after 1 January 2000 were eligible to be registered in these squads, only players registered in the squads were eligible to take part in the tournament.

Group A

Cameroon
Head coach: Bertin Ebewelle

Notes

Gabon
Head coach: Pierre Mfoumbi

Ghana
Head coach: Samuel Fabin

Guinea
Head coach: Camara Souleymane

Group B

Angola
Head coach: Simão Sebastião Cose José

Mali
Head coach: Jonas Kokou Komla

Niger
Head coach: Hamidou Harouna

Tanzania
Head coach: Bakari Nyundo Shime S

References

2017 Africa U-17 Cup of Nations